Melwood, in West Derby, Liverpool, was Liverpool Football Club's training ground from the 1950s until November 2020. It was not attached to The Liverpool F.C. Academy, which is at Kirkby. Melwood was bought by affordable housing development company Torus in 2019, as Liverpool invested in the Kirkby training ground so the First Team and Academy could train together, with increased space and better facilities. Liverpool's First Team and Academy have trained at the AXA Training Centre in Kirkby since November 2020. Liverpool's plans to move in the summer of 2020 had been delayed by the COVID-19 pandemic.

The Melwood ground previously belonged to St Francis Xavier, a local school. Melwood was named after two priests, Father Melling and Father Woodlock, who taught football at the school's playing fields.

History
Liverpool moved into the facility in the 1950s, after previously training on the Anfield grass. This was having a detrimental effect on the pitch and a decision was eventually made to take over a few football pitches in the West Derby area of the city. However, by the end of the decade, the training base had significantly deteriorated. When manager Bill Shankly arrived in 1959, the three playing fields and adjoining pavilion had not been maintained and the pitches were overgrown. In his autobiography, Shankly described it as a “sorry wilderness”. On seeing what looked like two huge bomb craters in one of the playing surfaces, he asked “have the Germans been here?”

Shankly and his staff subsequently sought to transform Melwood into a top-class training facility. He introduced the five-a-side games that defined his "pass and move, keep it simple", philosophy. Players would meet and change for training at Anfield and then board the team bus for the short trip to Melwood. After training, they would get the bus back to Anfield to shower and change and get a bite to eat. Shankly thus ensured all his players had warmed down correctly and he would keep his players free from injury. Indeed, in the 1965–66 season, Liverpool finished as champions using just 14 players, and two of those only played a handful of games.

In January 2001 Liverpool started work on the Millennium Pavilion, a modern facility for players and coaches, designed in part and heavily influenced by then manager Gérard Houllier. There is a small covered area for invited spectators. Training starts early in the morning with players arriving around 9 a.m. The players go through a morning session and are also required to turn in an evening session.

Redevelopment
In 1998, youth and development teams had been moved to a new 56-acre integrated training facility at The Academy in Kirkby.

Due to size constraints of the site and obvious secrecy issues associated with Melwood, in 2017 LFC revealed a plan of a proposed redevelopment of the Kirkby centre at a cost of £50 million, allowing the first team to move training to the expanded facility. The approved plan incorporated the first team and the academy at Kirkby, allowing the redevelopment of Melwood into housing. The Kirkby plan was expected to be completed before the 2019–20 season, allowing subsequent redevelopment of Melwood from summer 2020 onwards into 160 homes, mixed between detached and semi-detached properties, with an enclosed community amenity space.

References

External links

Liverpool F.C.
Association football training grounds in England